Diatraea considerata is a moth in the family Crambidae. It was described by Carl Heinrich in 1931. It is found in Sinaloa, Mexico.

References

Chiloini
Moths described in 1931